Recycler or Recyclers may refer to:

Environment
 Recycling, the process of converting waste materials into new materials and objects

People
 Recycler (person), waste collector
 Recycler, waste picker in developing countries

Technology
 Recycler (facility), a materials recovery facility
 Singlestream recycler, processor of unsorted material
 Electronic waste recyclers, a facility that processes e-waste
 Computer recycler, a facility that processes computer recycling
 Vehicle recycler, a facility that handles vehicle recycling
 Road recycler, engineering vehicle

Associations and companies
 Professional Electrical Apparatus Recyclers League, professional organization and standards group based in Denver, Colorado
 ReCellular, recycler and reseller of cell phones

Media

Publications
 The Recycler Los Angeles based, classifieds only newspaper

Film and TV
 Cyborg 3: The Recycler, 1995 direct-to-video sequel to Cyborg 2

Music
 , French electro-world duo Bruno Weiss (Tcherno) and Fabrice Charlot (Fab)
 Recycler (album) by ZZ Top
 Recycler Tour by ZZ Top
 "Recycler", song by Modey Lemon from Modey Lemon